Shagin Law Group is a law firm headquartered in Harrisburg, Pennsylvania.  Founded in 1996 as Shagin and Anstine the firm practices a wide variety of legal disciplines but specializes in the fields of immigration and international law.

Notable publications
Deporting Private Ryan: The Less Than Honorable Condition of the Noncitizen in the United States Armed Forces

Preparing for a Spousal Adjustment Interview

Industries served
Estates
Family Law
Immigration
International
Project Finance

References

External links
Official website

Companies based in Harrisburg, Pennsylvania
Law firms established in 1996
Law firms based in Pennsylvania